The following is a timeline of the history of the city of Worcester, Massachusetts, United States of America.

Prior to 19th century
 1669 – Common established.
 1719 – Town meeting house built.
 1733 – Court House built.
 1763 – Old South Meeting house built (approximate date).
 1775 
 Post office established.
 Massachusetts Spy newspaper relocates to Worcester.
1776 – July 14, first public reading of the Declaration of Independence by Isaiah Thomas.
 1786 – Worcester Magazine begins publication.
 1787 – First known printing of the word 'baseball' appears in A Little Pretty Pocket-book, Worcester, MA, by Isaiah Thomas, Rare Book and Special Collections, Library of Congress.
 1792 – Second Meeting House dedicated.
 1793 – Associate Library Company active.

19th century
 1800 – Independent Gazeteer begins publication.
 1801 – National Aegis newspaper begins publication.
 1812 – American Antiquarian Society founded.
 1818 – Worcester Agricultural Society incorporated.
 1819 – Fraternity of Odd Fellows active.
 1823 – Massachusetts Yeoman newspaper begins publication.
 1824 – Town Hall built.
 1825 – Worcester Lyceum of Natural History founded.
 1828 – Blackstone Canal opens.
 1829 
 Worcester County Republican newspaper begins publication.
 Worcester County Athenaeum and Worcester Lyceum active.
 1830 
 Worcester County Colonization Society formed.
 Worcester Social Library active.
 Population: 4,173.
 1832 – Worcester Law Library Association active.
 1833 
 Tolman carriage factory established.
 Ezra Rice House built.
 1834 
 St. John's Catholic Church established.
 Worcester Palladium newspaper begins publication.
 Worcester Academy established.
 1835 – Harris' Circulating Library in operation.
 1838 
 P. Young variety store established.
 Christian Reflector newspaper begins publication.
 Rural Cemetery is incorporated.
 1843 – College of the Holy Cross established.
 1840
 Worcester County Horticultural Society formed.
 Population: 7,497.
 1844 – Worcester Almanac begins publication.
 1845 
 Daily Transcript and Worcester County Gazette newspapers begin publication.
 Classical and English High School opens.
 1847 – Worcester Telegraph and Worcester Daily Journal newspapers begin publication.
 1848 
 Worcester (a town) becomes the City of Worcester.
 Levi Lincoln, Jr. becomes mayor.
 City hosts Whig State Convention.
 1849 – Oread Institute founded.
 1850
 National Women's Rights Convention held in city.
 Population: 17,049.
 1851 – Daily Morning Transcript newspaper begins publication.
 1852 – Worcester Young Men's Christian Association founded.
 1853 
 Worcester Rhetorical Society incorporated.
 Emmanuel Baptist church built.
 Agricultural Fairgrounds in operation (approximate date).
 1854 
 Hope Cemetery laid out.
 Mission Chapel built.
 1856 – Worcester Employment Society and Highland Military School founded.
 1857 
 Mechanics Hall built.
 Ladies' Collegiate Institute opens.
 1858 – Worcester Music Festival begins; Frohsinn Gesang Verein chorus formed.
 1860 – A.H. Word's Select Circulating Library active.
 1862 – Free Public Library building constructed on Elm Street.
 1864 – Dale Hospital opens.
 1865 – Worcester County Free Institute of Industrial Science founded.
 1866 – Worcester County Homoeopathic Medical Society formed.
 1868 – Chamberlain's Circulating Library in operation.
 1869 – Elwood Adams hardware store in business.
 1872 – South End commercial circulating library in operation.
 1873 – Home for Aged Women opens.
 1874 
 Worcester Normal School established.
 Soldiers' Monument dedicated.
 Cathedral of Saint Paul built.
 1875 
 Worcester Society of Antiquity formed.
 Train station built.
 1876 – Grand Army of the Republic Hall built.
 1877 – Irvings base ball team active.
 1879 – Worcester Worcesters base ball team formed (approximate date).
1880 – First perfect game in Major League Baseball history pitched by Lee Richmond, pitcher for the Worcester Worcesters.
 1884 
 Worcester bicentennial.
 St. Peters Catholic Church built.
 1885 – Frederick Daniels House built.
 1886
 Worcester Daily Telegram newspaper begins publication.
 Hatters' and Furnishers' Association formed.
 1887 
 Clark University founded.
 Becker's Business College formed.
 Pilgrim Congregational Church built.
 Horseshoers' Union organized.
 1888 – St. Mark's Episcopal Church built.
 1889 – Old South Church built, corner Main and Wellington St.
 1891 – Lothrop's Opera House opens.
 1892 – New English High School opens.
 1894 – St. Matthew's Episcopal Church and South Unitarian Church built.
 1895 – Union Congregational Church built.
 1897 – Worcester Art Museum School established.
 1898 
 Worcester Art Museum building opens.
 Worcester City Hall built.
 1899 – Worcester Business Institute established.

20th century
 1900
 Population: 118,421.
 Bancroft School established.
 Bancroft Tower in Salisbury Park erected.
 1901 – Worcester Magazine begins publication.
 1904 
 Assumption College established.
 Shaarai Torah congregation incorporated.
 1906 
 Boulevard Park opens.
 Worcester Lunch Car and Carriage Manufacturing Company founded.
 Labor News begins publication.
 Worcester Domestic Science School established.
 1907 – Slater Building constructed.
 1910 – Population: 145,986.
 1911 – Train station rebuilt.
 1912 
 Bancroft Hotel built.
 Burnside Fountain installed.
 1913 – Greendale Branch Library, Quinsigamond Branch Library and South Worcester Branch Library built.
 1914 
 Park Building constructed.
 September – Fashion Week.
 1921 – Temple Emanuel founded.
 1923 – Worcester Panthers baseball team active.
 1924 
 Fitton Field stadium opens.
 Congregation Beth Israel founded.
 1927   
 Foley Stadium built.
 Worcester Airport opens.
 1931 – Higgins Armory Museum opens.
 1938 – Worcester Junior College established.
 1950 – Roman Catholic Diocese of Worcester established.
 1952 – Massachusetts Route 146 highway constructed.
 1953 – Tornado.
 1954 – Worcester Area Sports Car Club formed.
 1955 – Commerce Bank & Trust Company founded.
 1962 – University of Massachusetts Medical School established.
 1963 
Smiley created by Harvey Ross Ball.
Quinsigamond Community College founded.
 1968 – Worcester Consortium of Universities founded.
 1971 
 Worcester Center Galleria opens.
 Worcester Science Center and Mechanics Tower built.
 1974 
 Worcester Regional Transit Authority established.
 Worcester Plaza built.
 1975 – Joseph D. Early becomes U.S. representative for Massachusetts's 3rd congressional district.
 1976 – Worcester Magazine begins publication.
 1980 – New England Summer Nationals automotive festival begins.
 1982 – Centrum arena opens.
 1983 – Interstate 190 highway in operation.
 1986 – Telegram & Gazette newspaper formed.
 1987 
 Greater Worcester Land Trust founded.
 United States District Court for the District of Massachusetts division opens.
 Sister city relationship established with Pushkin, Russia.
 1988 
 Jordan Levy becomes mayor.
 Worcester Historical Museum opens on Elm Street.
 1991 – Sky Mark Tower built.
 1994 
 Raymond Mariano becomes mayor.
 Worcester Women's History Project founded.
 Worcester IceCats hockey team active.
 1996 
 City website online (approximate date).
 Worcester Sharks ice hockey team active.
 Music Worcester Inc. formed.
 1997 – Jim McGovern becomes U.S. representative for Massachusetts's 3rd congressional district.
 1999 – Worcester Cold Storage Warehouse fire.

21st century

 2000 
 Massachusetts College of Pharmacy and Health Sciences campus opens.
 Union Station renovated.
 2001 – Worcester Public Library main branch renovated.
 2002 – Tim Murray becomes mayor.
2004 – Worcester IceCats hockey team sold and moves out of Worcester.
 2005 – Worcester Tornadoes baseball team formed.
 2007 – Konstantina Lukes becomes mayor.
 2010 – Joseph C. O'Brien becomes mayor.
 2011 – Worcester Hydra soccer team founded.
 2012 – 
Joseph Petty becomes mayor. 
Worcester Tornados baseball team's final season.
2013 – Higgin's Armory Museum closes.
2014 – Worcester Bravehearts baseball team formed. 
2015 – Worcester Sharks hockey team moves to San Jose.
2017 – Worcester Railers hockey team formed.
2018 – Massachusetts Pirates indoor football team formed.

See also
 Worcester history
 List of mayors of Worcester, Massachusetts
 Worcester, Massachusetts Firsts
 Media in Worcester, Massachusetts
 Timelines of other municipalities in the Greater Boston area of Massachusetts: Boston, Cambridge, Haverhill, Lawrence, Lowell, Lynn, New Bedford, Salem, Somerville, Waltham

Images

References

Bibliography

Published in the 18th-19th century
 
 
 
 
 
 
 
 
 
 
 
 

Published in the 20th century
 . See also: v.3 (1902);  v.6 (1903); v.14 (1911); v.15 (1912); v.19 (1916)
 
 
 
 
 
 
 
 

Published in the 21st century

External links

 Items related to Worcester, Massachusetts, various dates (via Digital Public Library of America).
 Map of the city of Worcester, 1889.
 . "236 portraits of people of color–- African Americans and people of Native American descent" in the Beaver Brook neighborhood of Worcester

 
worcester